Hatsina is a village in the Southern Region of Eritrea and has an elevation of 1,958 metres. Hatsina is situated east of Adi Beyani.

References

Villages in Eritrea